The 1977 Seattle Mariners season was the first season in franchise history, which was established via the 1977 Major League Baseball expansion. The creation of the Mariners brought baseball back to Seattle, which had been without a major league team since the Seattle Pilots left for Milwaukee to become the Brewers in April 1970.

Offseason 

 September 3, 1976: Former Red Sox manager Darrell Johnson is hired to be the team's first manager.  Lou Gorman, Seattle's director of baseball operations, states that Johnson will help in scouting players for the upcoming expansion draft.
 October 1, 1976: Dave Johnson was purchased by the Mariners from the Baltimore Orioles.
 October 22, 1976: Diego Seguí was purchased by the Mariners from the San Diego Padres.
 November 5, 1976: The 1976 Major League Baseball expansion draft was held. The Mariners (along with their expansion partners, the Toronto Blue Jays) selected 30 players to fill their major league roster.
 April 1, 1977: Mike Kekich was purchased by the Mariners from the Tecolotes de Nuevo Laredo.

Regular season

The first game

Linescore 
April 6, Kingdome, Seattle, Washington

Boxscore

Batting

Pitching

Other notable events 
 April 10, 1977: Designated hitter Juan Bernhardt hit the first home run in team history.
 April 13, 1977:  The first extra innings game in team history resulted in a 3–2 win over the Minnesota Twins.
 May 19, 1977:  The first shutout win in team history was a 3–0 victory over the Oakland Athletics.
 July 1, 1977: The Milwaukee Brewers played their first game in Seattle since 1969, when they were the Seattle Pilots. The Brewers beat the hometown Mariners, 2–1.
 July 8, 1977:  Scored the most runs of the season in a 13–11 win against the Minnesota Twins.

Season standings

Record vs. opponents

Notable transactions 
 April 20, 1977: Pete Broberg was traded by the Mariners to the Chicago Cubs for a player to be named later. The Cubs completed the deal by sending Jim Todd to the Mariners on October 25.
 May 2, 1977: Dave Johnson was purchased from the Mariners by the Minnesota Twins.
 June 7, 1977: Tony Phillips was drafted by the Mariners in the 16th round of the 1977 Major League Baseball Draft, but did not sign.
 July 27, 1977: Dave Pagan was traded by the Mariners to the Pittsburgh Pirates for a player to be named later. The Pirates completed the deal by sending Rick Honeycutt to the Mariners on August 22.
 August 2, 1977: Stan Thomas was traded by the Mariners to the New York Yankees for future considerations.
 September 9, 1977: Bill Laxton and cash were traded by the Mariners to the Cleveland Indians for Ray Fosse.

Roster

Game log

|- align="center"
| 1 || April 6 || California Angels || 0–7 || Tanana (1–0)|| Segui (0–1)|| || 57,762 || 0–1
|- align="center"
| 2 || April 7 || California Angels || 0–2 || Ryan (1–0)|| Romo (0–1)|| || 10,144 || 0–2
|- align="center" bgcolor="bbffbb"
| 3 || April 8 || California Angels || 7–6 || Laxton (1–0) || Verhoeven (0–1) || || 11,845 || 1–2
|- align="center" bgcolor="bbffbb"
| 4 || April 9 || California Angels || 5–1 || Wheelock (1–0) || Simpson (0–1) || Montague (1) || 27,668 || 2–2
|- align="center"
| 5 || April 10 || California Angels || 5–12 || Tanana (2–0) || Abbott (0–1) || || 10,405 || 2–3
|- align="center"
| 6 || April 11 || Minnesota Twins || 3–12 || Zahn (1–0) || Segui (0–2) || || 8,979 || 2–4
|- align="center"
| 7 || April 12 || Minnesota Twins || 2–3 || Schueler (1–1) || Laxton (1–1)  || Burgmeier (2) || 8,589 || 2–5
|- align="center" bgcolor="bbffbb"
| 8 || April 13 || Minnesota Twins || 3–2 || Moore (1–0) || Burgmeier (0–1) || || 11,635 || 3–5
|- align="center" bgcolor="bbffbb"
| 9 || April 14 || Minnesota Twins || 4–3 || Wheelock (2–0) || Redfern (0–2) || Montague (2) || 9,167 || 4–5
|- align="center"
| 10 || April 15 ||@ California Angels || 0–7 || Ryan (2–1) || Abbott (0–2) || || 34,654 || 4–6
|- align="center"
| 11 || April 16 ||@ California Angels || 4–6 || Hartzell (1–0) || Montague (0–1) || Kirkwood (1) || 19,690 || 4–7
|- align="center" bgcolor="bbffbb"
| 12 || April 17 ||@ California Angels || 11–7 || Kekich (1–0) || Monge (0–1) || Pagan (1) || 13,813 || 5–7
|- align="center" bgcolor="bbffbb"
| 13 || April 18 || Texas Rangers || 8–6 || Thomas (1–0) || Alexander (1–1) || Laxton (1) || 9,535 || 6–7
|- align="center"
| 14 || April 19 || Texas Rangers || 1–3 || Lindblad (1–0) || Wheelock (2–1) || || 10,947 || 6–8
|- align="center" 
| 15 || April 20 || Texas Rangers || 2–5 || Briles (1–0) || Montague (0–2) || Devine (1) || 10,763 || 6–9
|- align="center"
| 16 || April 22 || Kansas City Royals || 5–6 || Littell (2–1) || Pagan (0–1) || Gura (2) || 19,756 || 6–10
|- align="center"
| 17 || April 23 || Kansas City Royals || 6–8 || Leonard (1–0) || Segui (0–3) || Gura (3) || 22,685 || 6–11
|- align="center"
| 18 || April 24 || Kansas City Royals || 1–16 || Colborn (3–1) || Wheelock (2–2) || || DH || 6–12
|- align="center" bgcolor="bbffbb"
| 19 || April 24 || Kansas City Royals || 4–2 || Montague (1–2) || Splittorff (1–1) || || 21,734 || 7–12
|- align="center"
| 20 || April 26 || @ Minnesota Twins || 3–5 || Burgmeier (2–1) || Thomas (1–1) || Johnson (2) || 3,422 || 7–13
|- align="center"
| 21 || April 27 || @ Minnesota Twins || 3–5 || Johnson (3–0) || Moore (1–1) || Burgmeier (3) || 3,170 || 7–14
|- align="center" bgcolor="bbffbb"
| 22 || April 28 || @ Minnesota Twins || 4–3 || Montague (2–2) || Goltz (0–2) || || 3,766 || 8–14
|- align="center"
| 23 || April 29 || @ New York Yankees || 0–3 || Guidry (2–0) || Thomas (1–2) || Lyle (5) || 15,284 || 8–15
|- align="center"
| 24 || April 30 || @ New York Yankees || 2–7 || Figueroa (2–2) || Wheelock (2–3) || || 19,525 || 8–16
|-

|- align="center"
| 25 || May 1 || @ New York Yankees || 2–5 || Holtzman (2–1) || Abbott (0–3) || Lyle (6) || 20,477 || 8–17
|- align="center" bgcolor="bbffbb"
| 26 || May 3 || @ Boston Red Sox || 10–8 || Montague (3–2) || Wise (1–2) || Pagan (2) || 12,422 || 9–17
|- align="center"
| 27 || May 4 || @ Boston Red Sox || 2–5 || Cleveland (2–2) || Thomas (1–3) || Campbell (3) || 11,408 || 9–18
|- align="center"
| 28 || May 5 || @ Boston Red Sox || 2–5 || Jenkins (4–1) || Segui (0–4) || || 10,358 || 9–19
|- align="center" 
| 29 || May 6 || @ Baltimore Orioles || 1–4 || Grimsley (3–1) || Abbott (0–4) || || 4,402 || 9–20
|- align="center"
| 30 || May 7 || @ Baltimore Orioles || 2–4 || May (3–3) || Jones (0–1) || Flanagan (1) || 16,212 || 9–21
|- align="center"
| 31 || May 8 || @ Baltimore Orioles || 4–6 || Palmer (5–1) || Pole (0–1) || McGregor (1) || 9,638 || 9–22
|- align="center"
| 32 || May 9 || @ Toronto Blue Jays || 4–10 || Singer (2–4) || Thomas (1–4) || || 11,680 || 9–23
|- align="center"
| 33 || May 10 || @ Toronto Blue Jays || 3–9 || Garvin (5–0) || Montague (3–3) || || 13,017 || 9–24
|- align="center" bgcolor="bbffbb"
| 34 || May 11 || New York Yankees || 5–2 || Laxton (2–1) || Holtzman (2–2) || Romo (1) || 23,978 || 10–24
|- align="center" bgcolor="bbffbb"
| 35 || May 12 || New York Yankees || 8–6 || Moore (2–1) || Hunter (1–2) || || 42,132 || 11–24
|- align="center" 
| 36 || May 13 || Boston Red Sox || 5–7 || Willoughby (3–0) || Romo (0–2) || Campbell (4) || 20,523 || 11–25
|- align="center"
| 37 || May 14 || Boston Red Sox || 4–8 || Stanley (3–0) || Thomas (1–5) || Campbell (5) || 52,485 || 11–26
|- align="center"
| 38 || May 15 || Boston Red Sox || 4–5 || Lee (1–0) || Jones (0–2) || Campbell (6) || 47,353 || 11–27
|- align="center" bgcolor="bbffbb"
| 39 || May 16 || Baltimore Orioles || 8–3 || Abbott (1–4) || Palmer (5–3) || Kekich (1) || 10,388 || 12–27
|- align="center" bgcolor="bbffbb"
| 40 || May 17 || Baltimore Orioles || 10–2 || Romo (1–2) || May (4–4) || || 10,920 || 13–27
|- align="center" bgcolor="bbffbb"
| 41 || May 19 || @ Oakland Athletics || 3–0 || Pagan (1–1) || Langford (3–3) || || 2,179 || 14–27
|- align="center"
| 42 || May 20 || @ Oakland Athletics || 5–14 || Medich (3–2) || Jones (0–3) || || 2,660 || 14–28
|- align="center" bgcolor="bbffbb"
| 43 || May 21 || @ Oakland Athletics || 7–6 || Kekich (2–0) || Lacey (1–1) || || 3,230 || 15–28
|- align="center" bgcolor="bbffbb"
| 44 || May 22 || @ Oakland Athletics || 6–2 || Pole (1–1) || Blue (3–4) || Romo (2) || 3,138 || 16–28
|- align="center"
| 45 || May 24 || @ Cleveland Indians || 5–7 || Waits (2–0) || Romo (1–3) || Kern (4) || 5,576 || 16–29
|- align="center"
| 46 || May 25 || @ Cleveland Indians || 1–2 || Eckersley (4–3) || Laxton (2–2) || || 4,516 || 16–30
|- align="center" bgcolor="bbffbb"
| 47 || May 27 || @ Detroit Tigers || 2–1 || Abbott (2–4) || Fidrych (0–1) || Kekich (2) || 44,207 || 17–30
|- align="center" bgcolor="bbffbb"
| 48 || May 28 || @ Detroit Tigers || 3–1 || Pole (2–1) || Rozema (4–2) || Laxton (2) || 15,820 || 18–30
|- align="center" bgcolor="bbffbb"
| 49 || May 29 || @ Detroit Tigers || 6–4 || Thomas (2–5) || Foucault (3–2) || || 11,778 || 19–30
|- align="center" bgcolor="bbffbb"
| 50 || May 30 || @ Texas Rangers || 7–4 || Romo (2–3) || Blyleven (4–6) || Laxton (3) || DH || 20–30
|- align="center" bgcolor="bbffbb"
| 51 || May 30 || @ Texas Rangers || 9–3 || Montague (4–3) || Perry (4–5) || Segui (1) || 17,844 || 21–30
|-

|- align="center"
| 52 || June 1 || Oakland Athletics || 3–6 || Medich (5–2) || Abbott (2–5) || Coleman (2) || 14,350 || 21–31
|- align="center"
| 53 || June 2 || Oakland Athletics || 0–1 || Norris (2–1) || Pole (2–2) || || 10,712 || 21–32
|- align="center"
| 54 || June 3 || Cleveland Indians || 1–7 || Eckersley (6–3) || Jones (0–4) || Kern (5) || 19,438 || 21–33
|- align="center"
| 55 || June 4 || Cleveland Indians || 5–7 || Waits (3–0) || Kekich (2–1) || Monge (3) || 24,074 || 21–34
|- align="center" bgcolor="bbffbb"
| 56 || June 5 || Cleveland Indians || 6–1 || Montague (5–3) || Bibby (4–3) || || 14,167 || 22–34
|- align="center"
| 57 || June 7 || Detroit Tigers || 2–5 || Rozema (6–2) || Abbott (2–6) || Foucault (5) || 10,050 || 22–35
|- align="center" bgcolor="bbffbb"
| 58 || June 8 || Detroit Tigers || 3–2 || Kekich (3–1) || Hiller (3–6) || || 11,211 || 23–35
|- align="center" bgcolor="bbffbb"
| 59 || June 9 || Detroit Tigers || 2–1 || Romo (3–3) || Sykes (0–2) || || 10,840 || 24–35
|- align="center"
| 60 || June 10 || Toronto Blue Jays || 3–4 || Lemanczyk (4–5) || Montague (5–4) || Willis (4) || 11,786 || 24–36
|- align="center"
| 61 || June 11 || Toronto Blue Jays || 4–5 || Johnson (2–2) || Romo (3–4) || || 21,318 || 24–37
|- align="center" bgcolor="bbffbb"
| 62 || June 12 || Toronto Blue Jays || 5–2 || Pole (3–2) || Vuckovich (2–5) || || 28,412 || 25–37
|- align="center"
| 63 || June 14 || Oakland Athletics || 3–6 || Torrealba (3–0) || House (1–1) || Lacey (3) || 13,764 || 25–38
|- align="center" bgcolor="bbffbb"
| 64 || June 15 || Oakland Athletics || 6–5 || Kekich (4–1) || Torrealba (3–1) || || 14,248 || 26–38
|- align="center" bgcolor="bbffbb"
| 65 || June 16 || Oakland Athletics || 3–1 || Abbott (3–6) || Langford (4–5) ||  || 11,097 || 27–38
|- align="center" bgcolor="bbffbb"
| 66 || June 17 || @ Texas Rangers || 2–1 || Pole (4–2) || Marshall (2–1) || House (1) || DH || 28–38
|- align="center"
| 67 || June 17 || @ Texas Rangers || 6–8 || Briles (3–3) || Wheelock (2–4) || Devine (3) || 21,577 || 28–39
|- align="center" bgcolor="bbffbb"
| 68 || June 18 || @ Texas Rangers || 6–1 || Jones (1–4) || Blyleven (6–8) ||  || 17,352 || 29–39
|- align="center" bgcolor="bbffbb"
| 69 || June 19 || @ Texas Rangers || 2–1 || Romo (4–4) || Perry (6–6) || || 12,465 || 30–39
|- align="center" bgcolor="bbffbb"
| 70 || June 20 || @ Kansas City Royals || 4–2 || Wheelock (3–4) || Leonard (4–8) || Romo (3) || 21,475 || 31–39
|- align="center"
| 71 || June 21 || @ Kansas City Royals || 3–13 || Colborn (8–7) || Abbott (3–7) ||  || 10,958 || 31–40
|- align="center"
| 72 || June 22 || @ Kansas City Royals || 3–4 || Bird (3–1) || Pole (4–3) || Littell (8) || 22,140 || 31–41
|- align="center" bgcolor="bbffbb"
| 73 || June 23 || @ Kansas City Royals || 8–6 || Romo (5–4) || Littell (5–3) || || 13,520 || 32–41
|- align="center"
| 74 || June 24 || @ Milwaukee Brewers || 1–7 || Sorensen (1–1) || Montague (5–5) || || 11,625 || 32–42
|- align="center" bgcolor="bbffbb"
| 75 || June 25 || @ Milwaukee Brewers || 8–3 || Wheelock (4–4) || Haas (4–5) || Romo (4) || 19,572 || 33–42
|- align="center"
| 76 || June 26 || @ Milwaukee Brewers || 6–8 || Caldwell (1–0) || Romo (5–5) || || 19,699 || 33–43
|- align="center"
| 77 || June 27 || @ Chicago White Sox || 4–10 || Kravec (3–2) || Pole (4–4) || Johnson (1) || 16,026 || 33–44
|- align="center"
| 78 || June 28 || @ Chicago White Sox || 4–10 || Barrios (7–3) || Montague (5–6) || || 8,365 || 33–45
|- align="center" bgcolor="bbffbb"
| 79 || June 29 || @ Chicago White Sox || 3–1 || House (2–1) || Wood (1–2) || Romo (5) || 15,415 || 34–45
|-

|- align="center"
| 80 || July 1 || Milwaukee Brewers || 1–2 || Haas (5–5) || Wheelock (4–5) || || 16,119 || 34–46
|- align="center" bgcolor="bbffbb"
| 81 || July 2 || Milwaukee Brewers || 2–1 || Abbott (4–7) || Slaton (6–7) || Kekich (3) || 24,466 || 35–46
|- align="center"
| 82 || July 3 || Milwaukee Brewers || 3–10 || Augustine (9–9) || Pole (4–5) || || 16,226 || 35–47
|- align="center"
| 83 || July 4 || Chicago White Sox || 2–6 || Barrios (8–3) || Montague (5–7) || || 10,897 || 35–48
|- align="center" 
| 84 || July 5 || Chicago White Sox || 1–4 || Stone (9–6) || House (2–2) || LaGrow (13) || 14,032 || 35–49
|- align="center" 
| 85 || July 6 || Chicago White Sox || 2–4 || Wood (3–2) || Wheelock (4–6) || || 21,526 || 35–50
|- align="center" bgcolor="bbffbb"
| 86 || July 8 || @ Minnesota Twins || 13–11 || Laxton (3–2) || Thormodsgard (6–5) || Romo (6) || 11,966 || 36–50
|- align="center" bgcolor="bbffbb"
| 87 || July 9 || @ Minnesota Twins || 5–2 || Pole (5–5) || Goltz (9–6) || Romo (7) || 23,401 || 37–50
|- align="center"
| 88 || July 10 || @ Minnesota Twins || 0–15 || Zahn (7–7) || Thomas (2–6) || || 34,213 || 37–51
|- align="center"
| 89 || July 11 || @ Oakland Athletics || 1–8 || Coleman (1–0) || House (2–3) || Lacey (5) || 8,760 || 37–52
|- align="center"
| 90 || July 12 || @ Oakland Athletics || 2–3 || Blue (7–11) || Romo (5–6) || || 5,299 || 37–53
|- align="center" bgcolor="bbffbb"
| 91 || July 13 || @ Oakland Athletics || 3–1 || Abbott (5–7) || Langford (7–8) || || 4,529 || 38–53
|- align="center" bgcolor="bbffbb"
| 92 || July 14 || @ California Angels || 4–1 || Pole (6–5) || Brett (6–8) || Romo (8) || 11,400 || 39–53
|- align="center" bgcolor="bbffbb"
| 93 || July 15 || @ California Angels || 6–2 || House (3–3) || Nolan (4–3) || || 11,383 || 40–53
|- align="center" 
| 94 || July 16 || @ California Angels || 4–5 || Ryan (13–8) || Romo (5–7) || || 29,068 || 40–54
|- align="center" bgcolor="bbffbb"
| 95 || July 17 || @ California Angels || 8–7 || Kekich (5–1) || LaRoche (6–3) || || 10,879 || 41–54
|- align="center" bgcolor="bbffbb"
| 96 || July 21 || Oakland Athletics || 4–3 || Abbott (6–7) || Langford (7–10) || Romo (9) || 17,382 || 42–54
|- align="center" 
| 97 || July 22 || Oakland Athletics || 3–5 || Blue (9–11) || Pole (6–6) || Lacey (6) || 13,960 || 42–55
|- align="center" bgcolor="bbffbb"
| 98 || July 23 || Oakland Athletics || 10–3 || Wheelock (5–6) || Norris (2–7) || || 12,216 || 43–55
|- align="center" 
| 99 || July 24 || California Angels || 1–3 || Hartzell (4–6) || House (3–4) || Miller (3) || DH || 43–56
|- align="center"
| 100 || July 24 || California Angels || 3–4 || Simpson (5–7) || Galasso (0–1) || LaRoche (10) || 25,344 || 43–57
|- align="center" 
| 101 || July 25 || California Angels || 2–7 || Ryan (14–9) || Pole (6–7) || || 10,886 || 43–58
|- align="center" bgcolor="bbffbb"
| 102 || July 26 || Minnesota Twins || 9–7 || Abbott (7–7) || Thormodsgard (7–8) || Segui (2) || 12,017 || 44–58
|- align="center"
| 103 || July 27 || Minnesota Twins || 1–4 || Redfern (4–5) || House (3–5) || || 16,869 || 44–59
|- align="center" bgcolor="bbffbb"
| 104 || July 28 || Minnesota Twins || 5–2 || Wheelock (6–6) || Zahn (9–8) || Montague (3) || 11,759 || 45–59
|- align="center" 
| 105 || July 29 || Baltimore Orioles || 4–5 || Drago (4–3) || Kekich (5–2) || || 14,313 || 45–60
|- align="center"
| 106 || July 30 || Baltimore Orioles || 3–5 || Martinez (9–6) || Montague (5–8) || || 31,609 || 45–61
|- align="center" bgcolor="bbffbb"
| 107 || July 31 || Baltimore Orioles || 6–1 || Abbott (8–7) || Palmer (12–9) || || 11,464 || 46–61
|-

|- align="center"
| 108 || August 2 || Boston Red Sox || 2–3 || Campbell (11–7) || Montague (5–9) || || 24,344 || 46–62
|- align="center"
| 109 || August 3 || Boston Red Sox || 12–4 || Paxton (5–2) || Wheelock (6–7) || || 21,152 || 46–63
|- align="center" bgcolor="bbffbb"
| 110 || August 5 || New York Yankees || 5–3 || Pole (7–7) || Figueroa (10–8) || Romo (10) || 36,833 || 47–63
|- align="center" bgcolor="bbffbb"
| 111 || August 6 || New York Yankees || 9–2 || Abbott (9–7) || Hunter (6–7) || || 42,146 || 48–63
|- align="center"
| 112 || August 7 || New York Yankees || 1–7 || Torrez (11–10) || Montague (5–10) || || 29,412 || 48–64
|- align="center"
| 113 || August 8 || @ Chicago White Sox || 4–5 || Wiles (1–0) || Romo (5–8) || || 17,047 || 48–65
|- align="center"
| 114 || August 9 || @ Chicago White Sox || 3–13 || Stone (12–7) || Wheelock (6–8) || || 12,294 || 48–66
|- align="center"
| 115 || August 10 || @ Baltimore Orioles || 4–5 || May (13–10) || Pole (7–8) || Drago (5) || 7,579 || 48–67
|- align="center"
| 116 || August 11 || @ Baltimore Orioles || 3–4 || Drago (5–3) || Romo (5–9) || || 7,893 || 48–68
|- align="center"
| 117 || August 12 || @ Boston Red Sox || 2–7 || Wise (9–4) || Mitchell (0–4) || || 27,005 || 48–69
|- align="center"
| 118 || August 13 || @ Boston Red Sox || 6–13 || Jenkins (9–7) || Galasso (0–2) || || 34,095 || 48–70
|- align="center"
| 119 || August 14 || @ Boston Red Sox || 1–11 || Paxton (6–2) || Wheelock (6–9) || || 31,223 || 48–71
|- align="center" 
| 120 || August 15 || @ Detroit Tigers || 1–13 || Sykes (3–4) || Pole (7–9) || || 14,414 || 48–72
|- align="center" bgcolor="bbffbb"
| 121 || August 16 || @ Detroit Tigers || 3–2 || Abbott (10–7) || Morris (1–1) || || 9,065 || 49–72
|- align="center" bgcolor="bbffbb"
| 122 || August 17 || @ Minnesota Twins || 3–2 || Mitchell (1–4) || Zahn (11–10) || Romo (11) || 11,739 || 50–72
|- align="center"
| 123 || August 18 || @ Minnesota Twins || 2–8 || Thormodsgard (10–9) || Galasso (0–3) || || 13,884 || 50–73
|- align="center"
| 124 || August 19 || Detroit Tigers || 4–6 || Rozema (14–4) || Pole (7–10) || Taylor (1) || 19,698 || 50–74
|- align="center"
| 125 || August 20 || Detroit Tigers || 3–7 || Wilcox (5–0) || Abbott (10–8) || || 55,670 || 50–75
|- align="center" 
| 126 || August 21 || Detroit Tigers || 4–5 || Crawford (5–5) || Mitchell (1–5) || Hiller (6) || 15,373 || 50–76
|- align="center" 
| 127 || August 22 || Cleveland Indians || 1–12 || Bibby (10–10) || Galasso (0–4) || || DH || 50–77
|- align="center" bgcolor="bbffbb"
| 128 || August 22 || Cleveland Indians || 4–3 || Montague (6–10) || Garland (10–15) || || 12,347 || 51–77
|- align="center" 
| 129 || August 24 || Toronto Blue Jays || 0–7 || Garvin (9–13) || Pole (7–11) || || DH || 51–78
|- align="center"
| 130 || August 24 || Toronto Blue Jays || 3–9 || Jefferson (8–13) || Abbott (10–9) || || 13,253 || 51–79
|- align="center" bgcolor="bbffbb"
| 131 || August 26 || @ Cleveland Indians || 4–2 || Romo (6–9) || Kern (6–8) || || 6,707 || 52–79
|- align="center"
| 132 || August 27 || @ Cleveland Indians || 0–10 || Eckersley (13–10) || Galasso (0–5) || || 7,876 || 52–80
|- align="center"
| 133 || August 28 || @ Cleveland Indians || 6–10 || Bibby (11–10) || Abbott (10–10) || || 9,599 || 52–81
|- align="center"
| 134 || August 30 || @ New York Yankees || 5–6 || Lyle (11–4) || Segui (0–5) || || 20,116 || 52–82
|- align="center"
| 135 || August 31 || @ New York Yankees || 4–5 || Lyle (12–4) || Galasso (0–6) || || 17,362 || 52–83
|-

|- align="center" bgcolor="bbffbb"
| 136 || September 2 || @ Toronto Blue Jays || 4–3 || Abbott (11–10) || Lemanczyk (10–13) || || 13,502 || 53–83
|- align="center" bgcolor="bbffbb"
| 137 || September 3 || @ Toronto Blue Jays || 6–2 || Montague (7–10) || Jefferson (8–14) || Romo (12) || 15,109 || 54–83
|- align="center" bgcolor="bbffbb"
| 138 || September 4 || @ Toronto Blue Jays || 7–2 || Mitchell (2–5) || Garvin (9–14) || || 17,084 || 55–83
|- align="center"
| 139 || September 5 || Kansas City Royals || 4–8 || Colborn (16–13) || Pole (7–12) || || 11,750 || 55–84
|- align="center"
| 140 || September 6 || Kansas City Royals || 0–10 || Splittorff (13–6) || Honeycutt (0–1) || || 7,191 || 55–85
|- align="center"
| 141 || September 7 || Kansas City Royals || 7–10 || Littell (7–4) || Romo (6–10) || Bird (11) || 7,814 || 55–86
|- align="center"
| 142 || September 8 || Kansas City Royals || 2–7 || Leonard (16–11) || Montague (7–11) || || 7,785 || 55–87
|- align="center" bgcolor="bbffbb"
| 143 || September 9 || Texas Rangers || 8–3 || House (4–5) || Perry (12–12) || || 8,245 || 56–87
|- align="center" 
| 144 || September 10 || Texas Rangers || 2–5 || Alexander (14–10) || Mitchell (2–6) || || DH || 56–88
|- align="center"
| 145 || September 10 || Texas Rangers || 1–7 || Moret (3–2) || Kekich (5–3) || || 12,800 || 56–89
|- align="center" bgcolor="bbffbb"
| 146 || September 11 || Texas Rangers || 6–4 || Romo (7–10) || Lindblad (4–4) |||| 8,363 || 57–89
|- align="center"
| 147 || September 13 || Milwaukee Brewers || 5–6 || Beare (3–3) || Abbott (11–11) || McClure (6) || 7,595 || 57–90
|- align="center"
| 148 || September 14 || Milwaukee Brewers || 5–8 || Rodriguez (4–6) || Erardi (0–1) || || 5,718 || 57–91
|- align="center" bgcolor="bbffbb"
| 149 || September 16 || @ Kansas City Royals || 4–1 || Medich (11–6) || Pattin (8–3) || || 19,072 || 58–91
|- align="center"
| 150 || September 17 || @ Kansas City Royals || 5–7 || Gura (7–5) || Segui (0–6) || || 27,067 || 58–92
|- align="center"
| 151 || September 18 || @ Kansas City Royals || 3–8 || Leonard (18–11) || Abbott (11–12) || || 33,397 || 58–93
|- align="center"
| 152 || September 20 || @ Milwaukee Brewers || 1–5 || Slaton (10–14) || Montague (7–12) || || 3,004 || 58–94
|- align="center" bgcolor="bbffbb"
| 153 || September 21 || @ Milwaukee Brewers || 11–4 || Romo (8–10) || Augustine (12–17) || || 3,008 || 59–94
|- align="center"
| 154 || September 22 || Chicago White Sox || 4–5 || Renko (6–2) || Burke (0–1) || LaGrow (24) || 8,211 || 59–95
|- align="center" bgcolor="bbffbb"
| 155 || September 23 || Chicago White Sox || 3–2 || House (5–5) || Barrios (14–6) || Montague (4) || 9,731 || 60–95
|- align="center"
| 156 || September 24 || Chicago White Sox || 3–8 || Kravec (10–8) || Segui (0–7) || || 17,636 || 60–96
|- align="center" bgcolor="bbffbb"
| 157 || September 25 || Chicago White Sox || 5–4 || Medich (12–6) || Stone (15–12) || Romo (13) || 11,589 || 61–96
|- align="center"
| 158 || September 28 || @ Texas Rangers || 1–3 || Perry (15–12) || Abbott (11–13) || || 4,860 || 61–97
|- align="center" bgcolor="bbffbb"
| 159 || September 29 || @ Texas Rangers || 2–1 || Mitchell (3–6) || Alexander (17–11) || Romo (14) || 4,714 || 62–97
|- align="center" bgcolor="bbffbb"
| 160 || October 1 || @ Chicago White Sox || 5–3 || Montague (8–12) || Barrios (14–7) || Romo (15) || DH || 63–97
|- align="center"
| 161 || October 1 || @ Chicago White Sox || 1–6 || Kravec (11–8) || Kekich (5–4) || || 5,778 || 63–98
|- align="center" bgcolor="bbffbb"
| 162 || October 2 || @ Chicago White Sox || 3–2 || Abbott (12–13) || Frost (1–1) || Romo (16) || 20,953 || 64–98
|-

Player stats

Batting

Starters by position 
Note: Pos = Position; G = Games played; AB = At bats; H = Hits; Avg. = Batting average; HR = Home runs; RBI = Runs batted in

Other batters 
Note: G = Games played; AB = At bats; H = Hits; Avg. = Batting average; HR = Home runs; RBI = Runs batted in

Pitching

Starting pitchers 
Note: G = Games pitched; IP = Innings pitched; W = Wins; L = Losses; ERA = Earned run average; SO = Strikeouts

Other pitchers 
Note: G = Games pitched; IP = Innings pitched; W = Wins; L = Losses; ERA = Earned run average; SO = Strikeouts

Relief pitchers 
Note: G = Games pitched; W = Wins; L = Losses; SV = Saves; ERA = Earned run average; SO = Strikeouts

Farm system

LEAGUE CHAMPIONS: Bellingham

References

External links 
1977 Seattle Mariners at Baseball Reference
1977 Seattle Mariners team page at www.baseball-almanac.com

Seattle Mariners seasons
Seattle Mariners season
Inaugural Major League Baseball seasons by team
Seattle Mariners